Zoë Marieh Urness (born 1984) is a photographer of Alaskan Tlingit and Cherokee Native American heritage.

Biography
Zoe Marieh Urness is a Pulitzer Prize-nominated and internationally recognized Tlingit and Cherokee photographer who creates portraits of modern Indigenous cultures in traditional regalia and settings to convey the message, "We are here, and we are thriving through our traditions." Drawing on her own childhood experience as a performer and cultural ambassador for Tlingit tribal heritage, Urness is masterful in sharing Indigenous narratives. Her signature style fuses documentary and fine art to create a seamless merging of past and present, and depicts ancestral ways being practiced by modern Natives in their full integrity. “As I evolve as an artist I feel as if my entire body of work is braided together as one story being told through my lens… I choose to use my camera as a tool to link the past and present through visual stories.” -Zoe Marieh Urness 

www.zoeurnessphoto.com

Life 
Urness was born in Washington, adopted at the age of four and raised by her great-great uncle and aunt. Her guardians fostered her education in tribal arts and history with the Alaskan Native Cultural Heritage Association in Seattle from kindergarten through high school graduation, ensuring that her Indigenous education was an integral part of her upbringing. While her non-native schoolmates had soccer practices on school nights and games on the weekends, she and her twin sister gathered with other Tlingit youth and elders to don their traditional regalia, learn, practice and share their traditional songs and dances. With her tribe, she traveled the state of Washington, the United States, and even overseas to Europe performing and sharing their stories with the world as a cultural ambassador. The experience left a lasting impression that would later become the foundation of her photographic work.

At the tender age of seven, Urness received her first camera from her grandmother. "The camera allowed me to relate to people," she says. "Subjects were endless and I explored them through the lens." More than just a fleeting hobby, photography became her passion and professional pursuit. She attended college and earned art degrees from Skagit Valley College in Mount Vernon, Washington and the Brooks Institute of Photography in Santa Barbara, California.

Early career 
After college graduation in 2008, she initially thought she would become a magazine photographer and began freelancing in Santa Barbara and Seattle shooting for Outside and Trend magazines, but an “aha” moment took her in another direction. 

Somewhere in her early career, she began studying the work of Edward S. Curtis, a world renowned documentary photographer of European descent whose mission was to document Indigenous peoples as a ‘vanishing race.’ His black and white and sepia toned portraits of Native subjects in their traditional regalia comprise some of the earliest and most revered photographic records of Native Americans in existence. In viewing Curtis’ images, something clicked for Urness. Rather than seeing the works as relics of the past, she saw herself and her own tribal members in those images. She felt an instant calling to pick up her camera and be the one behind the lens, a modern Indigenous woman, capturing and telling the visual narrative of Native peoples and cultures not vanishing, but very much alive today.

In 2014, she catapulted her own career with a Kickstarter campaign for her first photo project, 'Native Americans: Keeping the Traditions Alive', "to emphasize critically endangered languages captured with video and still imagery.”  In this project she photographed tribes across the US, including visits to the Havasupai at the bottom of the Grand Canyon, the Hopi at Second Mesa, the Apache Crown Dancers at Monument Valley, and Alaskan natives at the Biennial Celebrations in Juneau. From this first project forward, Urness has been continuously fascinated by documenting and exploring the nuances of each tribe’s expression of their culture and traditions in connection to their ancestral landscape and habitat.

Career honors and accomplishments 
From humble beginnings, Urness has grown to be a globally acclaimed Indigenous artist.  She has shown her work in international and domestic US art exhibitions, been published in major media publications, had her work acquired by museums, hung her work in galleries in the US and overseas, participated in many Native art shows and markets, and received astounding awards. 

Her greatest honors in the art market circuit include showing her Alaskan work at the Indigenous Fine Art Market and Santa Fe Indian Market for many seasons, winning Best in Division and Best in Category at Santa Fe Indian Market for multiple years, and being recognized by the California-based Autry Museum of the American West, the Art Basel fair in Miami, the Native Treasures Indian Arts Festival,  and the Heard Museum Guild Indian Fair and Market in Arizona. 

In the gallery and museum sector she has shown at Photo L.A. SPECTRUM and several other galleries in New Mexico, Arizona and the UK, including the ZOHI Gallery in Santa Fe, NM (which she co-owned). Her print “December 5th, 2016: No Spiritual Surrender” was acquired by two museums, the Autry Museum of the American West, and the Birmingham Museum of Art. She has also been in six national and international traveling exhibitions at various galleries and venues in Russia, Washington DC, California, Tennessee, Minnesota, New Mexico, Georgia, Arizona, Oklahoma and more from 2017 to 2020. A group of her photographs is a part of the Tia Collection in Santa Fe, New Mexico.

Her strongest acknowledgement to date may be her photograph “Dec. 5, 2016: No Spiritual Surrender”, at the Oceti Sakowin Camp on Standing Rock Sioux Reservation at the Dakota Access Pipeline Protests being nominated for a Pulitzer Prize in Feature Photography by World Literature Today, and appearing on the cover of the magazine's May 2017 issue, "New Native Writing: From Wounded Knee to Standing Rock.” However, she bears even more decorations than this, having received several awards from the Autry Museum and SWAIA Santa Fe Indian Market from 2015 to 2017. 

In March 2022, Urness received the Sony Alpha+ Female Grant for her “Indigenous Motherhood” project, and is currently in the process of producing this body of work. This monument in her art career reflects a major landmark in her personal life as well; the birth of her first child in winter 2021.

Awards 

 2018: Pulitzer Prize Nomination, Feature Photography Cover of World Literature today May – August 2017
 2017: Autry Museum of the American West, Best in Photography, 1st place 
 2016: SWAIA Santa Fe Indian Market, Best in Photography, 1st place 
 2016: Autry Museum of the American West, Acknowledgement
 2015: SWAIA Santa Fe Indian Market, Best in Black and White Photography, 1st place

Acquisitions 
"Raven Tells his Story in the Fog"
 2021: Tacoma Art Museum – Tacoma, WA
 2018: Western Spirit Scottsdale's Museum of the West – Scottsdale, AZ
 2017: Birmingham Museum of Art: Birmingham, Alabama
“December 5th, 2016: No Spiritual Surrender” 
 2018: Autry Museum of the American West, 40x32 Desaturated Metallic C-Print mounted to plexiglass Edition 1 of 1
 2017: Birmingham Museum of Art, 50x40 Metallic C-Print mounted to plexiglass Edition 1 of 1

Galleries 

 2018:  Webster Collections- Santa Fe, NM
 2017 to present: Altamira Fine Art, Scottsdale, AZ /Jackson Hole, WY
 2017: Zohi, Santa Fe, NM
 2016 to present: Mountain Trails Fine Art, Santa Fe, New Mexico
 2015 to 2017: Rainmaker Gallery, Bristol, United Kingdom
 2015: Manitou Galleries, Santa Fe, NM

Exhibitions 
"Hearts of our People: Native American Women in the Arts", Traveling Group Exhibition produced by Minneapolis Institute of Art

 2020 Fall: Renwick Gallery / Smithsonian Institute Washington DC
 2020 Summer: Philbrook Museum of Art, Oklahoma
 2020 Spring: Fowler Museum UCL A, California
 2019- 2020 September to January: First Center of Visual Arts Nashville, Tennessee
 2019 May to August: Minneapolis Institute of Art Minneapolis, Minnesota

"Borrowing the Earth", Russian Traveling Group Exhibition (10 images provided by artist)

 2019 February to March: Orenburg Fine Arts Museum
 2019 March to April: Ufa Fina Arts Museum
 2019 May to June: Izhevsk
 2019 July to August: Noviy Urengoy
 2019 August to September: Noyabrsk
 2019 September to October: South Urals History Museum in Chelyabinsk
 2019 November to December: Tyumen Fine Arts Museum

"Beyond Standing Rock", Group Exhibition 

 2019 February to August: Santa Fe, New Mexico

"Zoe Urness: Keeping the Traditions Alive", Solo Exhibition

 2017–2018 November to May: Booth Western Art Museum, Cartersville, Georgia

"Standing Rock: Art and Solidarity", Group Exhibition

 2017–2018 May to February: Autry Museum of the American West, California

"Untitled", Joint show with Navajo Painter Tony Abeyta

 2017 March: Altamira Fine Art, Scottsdale, Arizona

Art fairs 

 2015–2018: Heard Museum Guild Fair & Market, Phoenix, AZ
 2015–2018: SWAIA Santa Fe indian Market, Santa Fe, NM
 2015–2018: Native Treasures MIAC Art Market, Santa Fe, NM
 2016–2017: Autry Museum of the American West American Indian Arts Marketplace, Los Angeles, CA
 2016: Art Basel, Miami Beach, FL
 2015: Photo LA, Los Angeles, CA

Publications 

 2018 January: First American Art Magazine 
 2017 August/September: Native American Art
 2017 August: Indian Country Today
 2017 July 3rd: Santa Fe Reporter
 2017 May: World Literature Today (cover)
 2017: Native Peoples
 2016: BLOUIN International Art Collector Magazine
 2016: Western Art Collector

Public speaking 
 2017 November: Artist Lecture Series at the Booth Museum 
 2017 November: Educational Outreach – Cartersville High School, GA
 2016 April: Americans: Featured speaker at Museum of Indian Arts and Culture – Sharing the Native Keeping the Traditions Alive

References 

 Western Art Collector. Issue 152. April 2020. https://www.westernartcollector.com/issues/152
 Pratt, Stacy.” Zoe Urness’s Standing Rock photo entered for a Pulitzer”. First AmericanArt Magazine. January 25, 2018. http://firstamericanartmagazine.com/urness-photo/
 Native American Art Magazine. August September 2017 Issue. https://www.zinio.com/native-american-art-magazine/august-september-2017-no-10-i386575
 Arney, Sarah. “SHS grad finds herself at Standing Rock”. Stanwood Camano News. September 5, 2017. https://www.goskagit.com/scnews/news/shs-grad-finds-herself-at-standing-rock/article_694f41b6-12e8-5555-b391-c2cdbe020f96.html
 Jacobs, Alex. “The Santa Fe Zohi Gallery: Amazing Native Art and a Virtual Standing Rock Bicycle Tour”. Indian Country Today. August 22, 2017. https://indiancountrytoday.com/archive/santa-fe-zohi-gallery-amazing-native-art-virtual-standing-rock-bicycle-tour
 Killelea, Eric. “Art in the time of Protest”. Santa Fe Reporter. July 3, 2017. https://www.sfreporter.com/arts/2017/07/03/art-in-the-time-of-protest/
 World Literature Today. Cover. May 2017 Issue. https://www.worldliteraturetoday.org/2017/may
 Native Peoples Magazine. 2017 issue.
 BLOUIN International Art Collector Magazine. 2016 issue. Retired from publication. https://www.amazon.com/BLOUIN-AUCTION-INTERNATIONAL-MAGAZINE-COLLECTORS/dp/B07FM5RTP3 

1984 births
Living people
Photographers from Washington (state)
Native American photographers
Brooks Institute alumni
Native American artists
Native American women artists
People from Stanwood, Washington
21st-century American women
21st-century Native American women
21st-century Native Americans